The Particle Physics Project Prioritization Panel (P5) is a scientific advisory panel tasked with recommending plans for U.S. investment in particle physics research over the next ten years, on the basis of various funding scenarios. The P5 is a temporary subcommittee of the High Energy Physics Advisory Panel (HEPAP), which serves the Department of Energy's Office of Science and the National Science Foundation. In 2014 the panel was chaired by Steven Ritz of the University of California, Santa Cruz. In 2023, the panel will be chaired by Hitoshi Murayama of the University of California, Berkeley.

2014 report 
In 2013, HEPAP was asked to convene a panel (the P5) to evaluate research priorities in the context of anticipated developments in the field globally in the next 20 years. Recommendations were to be made on the basis of three funding scenarios for high-energy physics:
 A constant funding level for the next three years followed by an annual 2% increase, relative to the FY2013 budget
 A constant funding level for the next three years followed by an annual 3% increase, relative to the proposed FY2014 budget
 An unconstrained budget

Science drivers
In May 2014, the first P5 report since 2008 was released. The 2014 report identified five "science drivers"—goals intended to inform funding priorities—drawn from a year-long discussion within the particle physics community. These science drivers are:
 Use of the Higgs boson as a tool for further inquiry
 Investigation of the physics of neutrino mass
 Investigation of the physics of dark matter
 Investigation of the physics of dark energy and cosmic inflation
 Exploration of new particles, interactions, and physics principles

Recommendations 
In pursuit of the five science drivers, the 2014 report identified three "high priority large category" projects meriting significant investment in the FY2014–2023 period, regardless of the broader funding situation: the High Luminosity Large Hadron Collider (a proposed upgrade to the Large Hadron Collider located at CERN in Europe); the International Linear Collider (a proposed electron-positron collider, likely hosted in Japan); and the Long Baseline Neutrino Facility (an expansion of the proposed Long Baseline Neutrino Experiment (that was renamed the Deep Underground Neutrino Experiment), to be constructed at Fermilab in Illinois and at the Homestake Mine in South Dakota).

In addition to these large projects, the report identified numerous smaller projects with potential for near-term return on investment, including the Mu2e experiment, second- and third-generation dark matter experiments, particle-physics components of the Large Synoptic Survey Telescope (LSST), cosmic microwave background experiments, and a number of small neutrino experiments.

The report made several recommendations for significant shifts in priority, namely:
 An increase in the proportion of the high-energy physics budget devoted to construction of new facilities, from 15% to 20%-25%
 An expansion in scope of the Long Baseline Neutrino Experiment to a major international collaboration, with redirection of resources from other R&D projects to the development of higher powered proton beams for the neutrino facility
 Increased funding for second-generation dark matter detection experiments
 Increased funding of cosmic microwave background (CMB) research

The panel stressed that the most conservative of the funding scenarios considered would endanger the ability of the U.S. to host a major particle physics project while maintaining the necessary supporting elements.

Impact and outcomes since 2014 

A goal of the 2014 P5 exercise was to provide Congress with a science-justified roadmap for project funding. Five years later, in 2019, the Department of Energy Office of Science declared: "Congressional appropriations reflect strong support for P5. Language in appropriations reports have consistently recognized community’s efforts in creating and executing the P5 report strategy" and "P5 was wildly successful." From 2016 to 2020, the High Energy Physics (HEP) budget grew from less than $800 million to more than $1 billion.

However, members of the HEP community were concerned because the increased funding went primarily toward projects, while funding for core research and technology programs, which was also supported by P5, declined from $361 million to $316 million. In 2020, an assessment of progress of the P5-defined program produced by the High Energy Physics Advisory Panel (HEPAP) concluded: "While investments over the past 5 years have
focused on project construction, it will be fundamentally important to balance the components of the HEP budget to continue successful execution of the P5 plan. Operations of the newly constructed experiments require full support to reap their scientific goals. The HEP research program also needs strong support
to fully execute the plan, throughout the construction, operations, and data analysis phases of the experiments, and to lay a foundation for the future."

As of 2022, several of the "Large Projects" identified as priorities by the 2014 P5 had fallen considerably behind schedule or been affected by cost gaps, including:
 The Deep Underground Neutrino Experiment, has been descoped, with start-up delayed from 2027 to 2032.
 The mu2e experiment was delayed from 2020 to 2026. 
 The  PIP-II  project start-up was delayed from 2020 to 2028 startup.
 The High Luminosity LHC contributions from Fermilab faced a $90M cost gap in 2021.
 The International Linear Collider (ILC), proposed for construction in Japan, was "shelved".

2023 report

Issues
The P5 process will occur in spring 2023 and will be informed by the outcomes of the 2021 Snowmass Process finalized in summer 2022. The Snowmass 2021 study identified two existential threats to the field that P5 must address:

 That the field has entered a "nightmare scenario" because no unexpected physics signatures have been observed by experiments at the highest energy accelerator, the Large Hadron Collider. As pointed out by many at the final Snowmass meeting, this give little basis for the 2023 P5 to recommend new large projects.

	That LBNF/DUNE (also called the Deep Underground Neutrino Experiment), the flagship project that came out of the 2014 P5, will be reevaluated due to spiraling costs and extended delays. The escalation has led to comparisons to the Superconducting Super Collider (SSC), a particle physics Megaproject that was cancelled mid-way through construction in 1993 due to cost over-run---a debacle with enormous personal and scientific costs to the particle physicists involved.

Along with these major issues, P5 also faces a field that is less unified than in 2014, as was emphasized by the title of the Scientific American report on Snowmass 2021 outcomes: "Physicists Struggle to Unite around Future Plans." 
Some members of the field have expressed that the pressure to project a unified opinion is stifling debate, with one physicists telling a reporter from Physics Today: "There are big issues people didn’t discuss." Panel chair Hitoshi Murayama has expressed awareness of this problem, saying that "community buy-in is key" for the success of the P5 report.

Panel
The membership of the 2023 P5 was announced in December 2022, with Hitoshi Murayama of the University of California, Berkeley as head. See the official page.

Similar to 2014, the 2023 P5 members are all particle and accelerator physicists; no members specialize in project management. This places the committee in a good position to evaluate responses to the "nightmare scenario." However, this makes it difficult for the members to assess whether the information on cost and schedule provided to the committee has a sound basis. That lack of expertise may explain the how the 2014 P5 failed to foresee the LBNF/DUNE cost-and-schedule crisis, and will make it difficult for the 2023 P5 to head off an "SSC scenario."

Tasking
Regina Rameika from the Department of Energy Office of Science summarized the P5 charge in a presentation to the High Energy Physics Advisory Panel on Dec. 8, 2022. The charge asked P5 to: 

 Update the 2014 P5 strategic plan, making recommendations for actions within a ten year time-frame while considering a twenty year context.

 Re-evaluate the 2014 "science drivers" and recommended scientific projects, as well as make the scientific case for new initiatives.

 Maintain a balance between large projects and small experiments. P5 does not recommend specific small experiments but was asked to comment on the scientific focus for that portfolio. The emphasis on P5 direction to small experiments was new compared to the 2014 P5 charge.

 Address synergies within US programs and with the worldwide program.

The priority of projects is being considered within two funding scenarios from the Department of Energy (DOE) and the National Science Foundation (NSF).  The first, which was described by physicists as "grim", envisions a 2% increase per year of the high energy physics budgets for DOE and NSF.  The second assumes full funding from the 2022 CHIPS And Science Act   
and a 3% increase per year to DOE and NSF HEP.    P5 is asked to consider operating costs, including the rising cost of energy to run accelerators.

The panel was asked to deliver its report in August 2023, with final report approval in October of 2023.

References

External links 
 Building for Discovery: Strategic Plan for U.S. Particle Physics in the Global Context: Report of the Particle Physics Project Prioritization Panel (P5)

Scientific funding advisory bodies
Physics organizations
Experimental particle physics
United States Department of Energy
National Science Foundation